Mushayrafet al-Samouk is a town in northwestern Syria, administratively part of the Latakia Governorate, located north of Latakia. Nearby localities include Kirsana and Burj al-Qasab to the west, al-Shamiyah to the northwest, al-Qanjarah and Baksa to the southwest. According to the Syria Central Bureau of Statistics, Sitmarkho had a population of 4,000 in the 2004 census. Its inhabitants are predominantly Alawites.

References

Populated places in Latakia District
Alawite communities in Syria